Heart of the Alien is a cinematic platform game developed by Interplay Entertainment and Virgin Interactive and was released by Virgin Interactive in 1994 for the Sega CD exclusively in North America. It is a sequel to Another World and continues the story directly from where the original ended. The game switches the player's role from Another World; this time the player takes control of Buddy, the main character's alien ally from the previous game.

Gameplay
The game's control scheme is largely similar to that of its predecessor Another World, though there are several new elements related to the character's powerful energized whip. For example, Buddy can swing from stalactites or similar objects and his shields are deployed instantly, unlike Lester's, which take a few seconds to charge. As in Another World, there is no heads-up display.

Plot
The story picks up immediately after the end of Another World. Buddy lands the flying creature in the ruins of his village, lays Lester down on a cot to rest and walks through the village, thinking of his past. A flashback follows showing that Buddy's people were captured by soldiers led by one of the alien humanoids with red eyes. After recovering his power whip Buddy returns to the prison he and Lester escaped from in the first game trying to save his people.

Buddy and Lester overcome various obstacles, but later in the game Buddy is knocked unconscious, and Lester saves him by attacking an enemy alien but is electrocuted while doing so. Eventually Buddy is able to find the red-eyed alien and traps him in a cage with a beast that kills him. At the end of the game, Buddy gives Lester's body a ceremonial cremation. It is shown later how Buddy's village is rebuilt with its citizens living again in harmony.

Development
Eric Chahi recalled: "Interplay insisted in making the sequel in order to make the most of the CD-ROM medium's capabilities. After discussion, I agreed. Rather than making a chronological development related to the first story, I decided that redesigning the game from the alien point of view was excellent, and would make the player discover Another World with other eyes. I could already picture scenes where Lester would be in the background fighting guards, while the player would control the alien in the foreground and then join our first hero, help him, etc... The concept was good but, alas, neither the animations nor the game, entirely developed by Interplay, were up to the job. It was a flop." Reportedly, "quickly after it was released, Chahi made a public statement that the title did not represent his vision of the world he crafted and disowned it altogether from being treated as an official sequel."

Legacy
After Heart of the Alien became unsupported and unavailable, a fan took up the effort of extracting a source code variant from the binary game by reverse engineering to make the game runnable again on modern platforms. This extracted source code was made open-source and is hosted freely available on SourceForge.  An Amiga version has since been released that uses the assets of the Sega CD original.

Reception

GamePro hailed the game as even better than the original Out of This World, praising its sharply animated cutscenes, ingenious level design, evocative soundtrack, and the inclusion of the original game on the disc. They acknowledged that the controls are sometimes frustrating, but felt that practice and patience would inevitably overcome this issue. The four reviewers of Electronic Gaming Monthly likewise found it to be a strong sequel despite the control difficulties. They commented that the graphics suit the game's theme, the puzzle-like challenges are engaging, and the game's cinematic sequences and animations are outstanding. Sebastian Sponsel of Sega-16 gave the game an 8/10 rating and, while criticizing its relentless difficulty and controls, called the game an "enjoyable experience [and] a true sequel to a classic".

References

External links
 
 Heart of the Alien Redux - an open-source rewrite of the game engine. This program is designed as a cross-platform replacement for the original executable (data files from the CD are required).

1994 video games
Commercial video games with freely available source code
Platform games
Science fiction video games
Sega CD games
Sega CD-only games
Video games about extraterrestrial life
Video games developed in the United States
Video game sequels
Video games scored by Tommy Tallarico
Video games set on fictional planets
Video games with rotoscoped graphics
Virgin Interactive games
Cinematic platform games